Oleksandr Khimich (born 9 April 1975) is a Ukrainian rower. He competed in the men's single sculls event at the 1996 Summer Olympics.

References

External links
 

1975 births
Living people
Ukrainian male rowers
Olympic rowers of Ukraine
Rowers at the 1996 Summer Olympics
Place of birth missing (living people)